Dering is a surname, and may refer to:
 Charles L. Dering, American lawyer and politician
 Sir Cholmeley Dering, 4th Baronet, English politician
 Sir Edward Dering, 1st Baronet, English antiquary and politician
 Sir Edward Dering, 2nd Baronet, English politician
 Sir Edward Dering, 3rd Baronet, English politician
 Sir Edward Dering, 5th Baronet, English politician
 Sir Edward Dering, 8th Baronet, English politician
 George Edward Dering, English inventor
 Lady Mary Dering, English composer
 Richard Dering, English composer
 Wladisław Dering, Polish physician, plaintiff in Dering v Uris

See also
 , see Hudson's Bay Company vessels
 , see Hudson's Bay Company vessels
 Deering (disambiguation)
 Dearing (disambiguation)

External links
Stirnet: Dering1 

English-language surnames
Lists of people by surname